The Manchester Cancer Research Centre (MCRC) was established in 2006 by the University of Manchester, Cancer Research UK and The Christie NHS Foundation Trust. It has since been expanded through the Manchester Academic Health Science Centre to include Central Manchester University Hospitals NHS Foundation Trust, Salford Royal NHS Foundation Trust, University Hospital of South Manchester NHS Foundation Trust, Manchester Mental Health and Social Care Trust and Salford Clinical Commissioning Group.

See also 
 Cancer in the United Kingdom

References

2006 establishments in England
Academic health science centres
Cancer organisations based in the United Kingdom
Health in Greater Manchester
Medical education in England
Medical research institutes in the United Kingdom
Research institutes in Manchester
University of Manchester